Bruce Anders Marshall (born 29 March 1948) is a New Zealand taxonomist and malacologist. He is an expert on New Zealand mollusca and has named hundreds of species and genera.

Academic career
He is a self-taught malacologist and started working at the Museum of New Zealand Te Papa Tongarewa in 1976.

Until 2019, he was the Collection Manager of Molluscs at the Te Papa Tongarewa, where he described the largest number of new species in the history of the museum.

In 2012 he was awarded a Doctor of Science degree by Victoria University of Wellington. The conferment letter described him as "the leading authority on the taxonomy and systematics of living molluscs in New Zealand".

In 2018 he was awarded the Lifetime Achievement award by the Malacological Society of Australasia.

Taxa named in Marshall's honour
As of 2019, 24 species and 6 genera had been named after him. The genera are:

 Bruceiella Warén & Bouchet, 1993
 Bruceina Özdikmen, 2013
 Brucetriphora Beu, 2004
 Marshallaskeya Gründel, 1980
 Marshallopsis Cecalupo & Perugia, 2012
 Marshallora Bouchet, 1985

References

External links
 Museum of New Zealand Te Papa Tongarewa, Mollusc Publications by Bruce Marshall

1948 births
Living people
New Zealand malacologists
New Zealand biologists
New Zealand marine biologists
New Zealand taxonomists
New Zealand zoologists